Moskovskaya is a station on the Moskovsko–Petrogradskaya Line of the Saint Petersburg Metro. Although it was opened on December 25, 1969, it is equipped with the so-called platform screen doors. Moskovskaya metro-station is one of the first stations in the world with such a system of doors.

From Moskovskaya metro-station there is a direct connection to the Terminal One of Pulkovo Airport by shuttles buses No.39, 39E and K39.

External links

Saint Petersburg Metro stations
Railway stations in Russia opened in 1969
1969 establishments in the Soviet Union
Railway stations located underground in Russia